Marike Steinacker (born 3 April 1992) is a German athlete. She competed in the women's discus throw event at the 2020 Summer Olympics.

References

1992 births
Living people
German female discus throwers
Athletes (track and field) at the 2020 Summer Olympics
Olympic athletes of Germany
People from Rheinisch-Bergischer Kreis
Sportspeople from Cologne (region)
Universiade medalists in athletics (track and field)
Universiade silver medalists for Germany